The Renault EG is an all-wheel drive truck/artillery tractor produced between 1914 and 1919 by the French manufacturer Renault.

History
The Renault EG was tested at the 1914 tests for all-terrain vehicles organised by the French military. In 1914, Renault developed a lighter version, the FB, but it was abandoned for concentrating on the EG. During World War I, it was commissioned by the French military. Mass production started in 1915 and about 978 were built by the end of the war. According to François Vauvillier, a total of 1,132 EGs were delivered to the French army. EGs, along with the Berliet CBA, the Latil TAR, the Renaults  EP and FU, and the Saurer Type B, were key vehicles of the Voie Sacrée (Holy Road) for supplying the French army during the Battle of Verdun. In March 1924, the French military commissioned more powerful successors of both the Renault EG and the Latil TAR. At tests conducted in 1926, the Renault candidate was not conclusively better than the EG, so the plan to replace it was abandoned. Renault did not produce heavy artillery tractors after that. About 635 EGs were still in service by October 1939, although most of them were destroyed during 1940.

Technical details

As other Renaults of that time, the radiator is located behind the engine. In the late 1920s, some EGs were fitted with a more powerful 7.8-litre inline-four engine delivering . The EG has a four-wheel steering system by which front and rear wheels are moved independently through two steering gears linked by universal joints to the steering wheel, improving the turning radius. The gearbox is a 4-speed operated through a gear lever. The double wheels are made of cast steel and are of the same diameter both on front and rear.

References

Citations

Bibliography

EG
Vehicles introduced in 1914
Military vehicles introduced in the 1910s